Galit Chait (Galit Hayat; born on January 29, 1975) is an Israeli former competitive ice dancer. She and her partner Sergei Sakhnovski competed internationally for Israel from 1995 to 2006, becoming the 2002 World bronze medalists.

Personal life
Chait was born in Israel. Her family moved to New Jersey when she was young, and she first skated at age 8.

Her father, Boris Chait, has been president of the Israeli Ice Skating Federation since 2002.

On August 23, 2008, Chait married former Italian military policeman Francesco Moracci in New Jersey and then on September 13, 2008 they had a second wedding in Florence, Italy. The two had met at the 2006 Olympic Games in Torino, Italy, where Moracci was a member of the security detail assigned to protect the Israeli team. They have two daughters, Raffaella, born in 2009, and Gabriella, born in 2011. They also have a son named Matteo.

Chait has been a resident of Paramus, New Jersey.

Career
She first tried ice dancing in the 1990s when she traveled to Russia with her father, who was teaching there at a sports camp.

She competed with Max Sevostianov at the U.S. Nationals in 1992 and 1994. They were involved in a collision with Renée Roca at the 1994 U.S. Championships. In 1994, the pair placed 6th at the U.S. Nationals and 28th at the World Championships (representing Israel).

Chait met Sergei Sakhnovski while they were both students at the University of Delaware. Partnered since 1995, they trained initially in Russia with Ludmila Buytskova and Elena Maslenikova before moving to Monsey, New York. They rose steadily in the international rankings. The highlight of their career was winning the bronze medal at the 2002 World championships. Sergei Sakhnovski suffered a foot injury that forced the pair to miss the entire 2006–2007 season, and they subsequently announced their retirement. Their coaches included Natalia Dubova, Tatiana Tarasova, Evgeni Platov, Natalia Linichuk and Gennadi Karponosov.

Chait was the flag bearer for Israel at the 2002 and 2006 Winter Olympics.

Chait is an ISU Technical Specialist.

Coaching career
After her retirement as a competitive skater, Chait began coaching ice dancing. She was the head coach of the Israeli brother-and-sister team Alexandra Zaretsky and Roman Zaretsky, and of Tamar Katz as well. In October 2008, Chait and the Zaretskys filed a lawsuit against the Ice House training rink in Hackensack, New Jersey, claiming that officials at the rink discriminated against them on the basis of their Israeli nationality, denying them prime skating time and threatening to ban them from the rink. The Zaretskys, under her coaching, won the gold medal at the 24th Winter Universiade Games in Harbin China, the bronze medal at Skate America 2009 and they qualified for the Winter Olympic Games in Vancouver Canada.

Chait has also coached:
Cathy Reed / Chris Reed
Siobhan Heekin-Canedy / Alexander Shakalov
Allison Reed / Otar Japaridze
Ekaterina Bugrov / Vasili Rogov
Siobhan Heekin-Canedy / Dmitri Dun
Anna Bolshem / Ronald Zilberberg
Adel Tankova/ Ronald Zilberberg

As of 2010, Chait was the head coach of the Israeli figure skating team.

Programs 
(with Sakhnovski)

Competitive highlights
GP: Champions Series / Grand Prix

With Sakhnovski

With Sevostianov

See also
List of select Jewish figure skaters

References

External links

 
 Official homepage – Chait / Sakhnovski (archived)

1975 births
Figure skaters at the 1998 Winter Olympics
Figure skaters at the 2002 Winter Olympics
Figure skaters at the 2006 Winter Olympics
Israeli female ice dancers
Living people
Olympic figure skaters of Israel
People from Kfar Saba
People from Paramus, New Jersey
World Figure Skating Championships medalists
People from Monsey, New York
Goodwill Games medalists in figure skating
Jewish Israeli sportspeople
Competitors at the 2001 Goodwill Games